Wilfrid Basil Mann (4 August 1908 – 29 March 2001) was a radionuclide metrologist.

He was born in Ealing, Middlesex in the United Kingdom on 4 August 1908, receiving his Doctorate in Physics from Imperial College of Science and Technology in London in 1937.
He did graduate work during the 1930s in Copenhagen and Berkeley. While at Berkeley he worked with E.O. Lawrence on the cyclotron in the radiation laboratory and was the discoverer of the radioisotope gallium-67, which is still in use in nuclear medicine.

His mentor at Imperial College was George Paget Thomson the British physicist in charge of the Tube Alloys project during the war years (the British nuclear program that was later incorporated into the Manhattan Project).
He had Mann assigned to the British Embassy in Washington DC and to the Chalk River Laboratory in Canada. In 1951, Wilfrid Mann came to the National Bureau of Standards (NBS) as the head of the Radioactivity Section. For the next 30 years Wilfrid Mann was the most influential radionuclide metrologist in the world.

During the early 1950s, he had a keen interest in the national standards for radium-226 and undertook microcalorimetric experiments to intercompare the national standards (Hönigschmid standards) of the United States, United Kingdom, Canada, and Germany. He retired from NBS in 1980. 

Mann was obliged to deny claims that he was a member of the Cambridge Spy Ring in his 1982 memoir Was There A Fifth Man? Mann had been accused on several occasions of being the "fifth man," based on rumored work at the Embassy and the resemblance between his middle name and the "Basil" of investigative journalist Andrew Boyle's book Climate of Treason. In his memoirs, Mann argued using contemporary correspondence, publications, and verified passport entries that he was incapable of having worked with Donald Maclean in the British Embassy. As part of his hiring at the Bureau of Standards, Mann underwent intense security screening and received a top-level "Q" clearance from the U.S. Atomic Energy Commission.

Mann died in Towson, Maryland in 2001.

Books
Mann's several texts include Radioactivity and Its Measurement, 1980 (Mann, Ayres, and Garfinkel), A Handbook of Radioactivity Measurements Procedures, NCRP Report 58, 1985 edition, and Radioactivity Measurements: Principles and Practice, 1988 (Mann, Rytz, and Spernol).

Notes

1908 births
2001 deaths
British nuclear physicists
20th-century British physicists
Fellows of the American Physical Society